Guy Ray Pelton (August 3, 1824 – July 24, 1890) was a U.S. Representative to the thirty-fourth Congress from New York.  Born in Great Barrington, Massachusetts, he was the second son of Joseph Kneeland Pelton and his wife Harriet Ray. He attended the public schools and Sedgwick Institution in Great Barrington, Mass., the Connecticut Literary Institute in Suffield, Connecticut, and Oberlin College.  He studied law at Kinderhook, N.Y.  He was admitted to the bar and commenced practice in New York City in 1851 with his older brother, Timothy Dwight Pelton, in the law firm of G.R. & T.D. Pelton, at 167 Broadway.  He was a member of the Union League Club.

A Whig, Pelton was elected as an Opposition Party candidate to the Thirty-fourth Congress (March 4, 1855 – March 3, 1857) from New York City.  During that time he served on the Committee of Commerce.  He declined a second nomination for reelection in 1856 to the Thirty-fifth Congress.

On July 24, 1890, on his way home to Massachusetts from Alaska with his second wife, Angelina Scoville Pelton, Pelton died in Yellowstone National Park, Wyoming, while climbing Mary Mountain.  He was interred in Mahaiwe Cemetery, Great Barrington, Massachusetts.

References

1824 births
1890 deaths
People from Great Barrington, Massachusetts
Opposition Party members of the United States House of Representatives from New York (state)
Accidental deaths in Wyoming
Mountaineering deaths
19th-century American politicians